Killed The Radio Star was the fifth album by Canadian punk rock band Closet Monster, released in 2002.

Track listing

"Battle Cry For A Better World"
"Mr. Holland Vs. Acceptable Behavior" 
"The Great Mall Explosion" 
"Sexism Is Real: Wrestling Is Not" 
"Corporate Media Death Squad" 
"Romanticism And The Fat Man" 
"Yes, This Is A Guilt Trip"  
"The Anti-Racist Sing-A-Long" 
"Smells Like Revolutionary Spirit"  
"Playground" 
"Melody's Song" 
"Plummet Of The Americas"

2002 albums
Closet Monster albums